George Stanley Byng, 8th Viscount Torrington (29 April 1841 – 20 October 1889), known as George Byng until 1884, was a British Conservative politician.

Origins
He was the son of Major the Hon. Robert Barlow Palmer Byng (third son of George Byng, 6th Viscount Torrington), by his wife Elizabeth Maria Gwatkin, a daughter of Major-General Edward Gwatkin, a son of Robert Lovell Gwatkin.

Career
In 1884 he succeeded his uncle George Byng, 7th Viscount Torrington (1812-1884) in the viscountcy. In 1888 his uncle's companion, Andalusia Molesworth died. She left her fortune to Byng as she was estranged from her ex-husband's family.

Byng served briefly as a Lord-in-waiting (government whip in the House of Lords) from March to October 1889 in the Conservative administration of Lord Salisbury.

Marriages and children
He married twice:
Firstly in 1882 to Alice Arabella (d. 1883), a daughter of James Jameson.
Secondly in 1885 to Emmeline Seymour (d. June 1912), a daughter of Rev. Henry Seymour, by whom he had children including:
George Master Byng, 9th Viscount Torrington (1886–1944).

Death and succession
He died in office in October 1889, aged 48, and was succeeded in the viscountcy by his son from his second marriage, George Master Byng, 9th Viscount Torrington (1886–1944).

Notes

References
 Kidd, Charles, Williamson, David (editors). Debrett's Peerage and Baronetage (1990 edition). New York: St Martin's Press, 1990, 
 
 

1841 births
1889 deaths
Viscounts in the Peerage of Great Britain
George
Place of birth missing